Homo LesBische Federatie Nederland (HLBF.nl) is an organization for gay, lesbian, and bisexual people in the Netherlands, Netherlands Antilles, and Aruba. The organization was founded June 14, 2004 in Breda.

See also

LGBT rights in the Netherlands
List of LGBT rights organizations

External links
Official website

LGBT political advocacy groups in the Netherlands
Organisations based in North Brabant
Breda
2004 establishments in the Netherlands
Organizations established in 2004